Thornton Hibs Football Club are a Scottish football club based in Thornton, Fife. Their home ground is Memorial Park and the team colours are green and white. They most recently (abandoned 2019–20 season) played in the Junior East Region Super League.

The Scottish Junior Football Association restructured prior to the 2006–07 season, and Hibs found themselves in the 12-team East Region, Central Division. They finished ninth in their first season in the division.

In May 2020, the club confirmed they had successfully applied to join the East of Scotland Football League within the senior pyramid.

Honours
Fife Junior Football League: 1952–53, 1958–59, 1968–69
Fife League East: 1937–38
 Fife Cup: 1935–36, 1958–59, 1974–75
 Fife & Lothians Cup: 2018–19
SJFA East Fife / Central: 2003–04, 2009–10
SJFA East North: 2014–15

References

External links
 Official club website

Football clubs in Scotland
Scottish Junior Football Association clubs
Association football clubs established in 1935
Football clubs in Fife
1935 establishments in Scotland
East of Scotland Football League teams